Elatostema stipitatum is a flowering plant in the nettle family. Often seen along rainforest streams or moist areas in eastern Australia, north from the Comboyne area of New South Wales to the Sunshine Coast area of Queensland. Leaves 1 to 6 cm long, 1 to 2.5 cm wide with a point, the base of the leaf may be asymmetric, leaves hairy with a toothed edge, the leaf stem may be absent, or 2 mm long. The plant can form mats and cover a large area.

References

stipitatum
Rosales of Australia
Flora of New South Wales
Flora of Queensland
Plants described in 1854